Emsstrom was a German  fishery protection vessel for the Federal Ministry of Food, Agriculture and Consumer Protection built as Frithjof in 1968 at Schlichting-Werft in Travemünde.

In 1998, the ship was renamed Emsstrom and used as a naval training ship in Leer, Germany, until 2012.

In January 2013, Emsstrom was under tow by the Greek tug Christos XXII (IMO number 7230135) where she was destined for Turkey to be scrapped. When Christos XXII anchored to investigate a list that Emsstrom had developed, Emsstrom collided with its side just after 20:58 UTC on 13 January.

Christos XXII sustained a  gash in her hull and was towed to Portland for repairs.

References

1968 ships
2013 in England
Fishery protection vessels
Maritime incidents in 2013
Shipwrecks in the English Channel